Joanna M. Jones (née Dorothy Kain, 1930 – 21 July 2017) was a phycologist, marine biologist and diver. She researched kelp forest ecology adding to the scientific knowledge on its population, reproduction, competition and growth as well as descriptions of subcanopy seaweeds found in kelp forests. She was president of the British Phycological Society from 1987 to 1988.

Early life 
Kain was born in Christchurch in 1930.

Career 
Kain worked at the Port Erin Marine Laboratory (PEML) until 1991.

Death
Jones died on 21 July 2017.

Some publications

References

20th-century New Zealand women scientists
New Zealand marine biologists
New Zealand women botanists
20th-century New Zealand botanists
Alumni of University College London
Women phycologists
British marine biologists
1930 births
2017 deaths